IBF NB 87  was a floorball club in Karlstad, Sweden, established as a merger out of the Norrstands IF and Bengens IBF floorball sections in 1987. before merging with Sjöstads IF in 2001, establishing Karlstads IBF.

The men's team played the 1996 Swedish national championship finals, losing to Balrog IK.

References

1987 establishments in Sweden
2001 disestablishments in Sweden
Sport in Karlstad
Swedish floorball teams
Sports clubs disestablished in 2001
Sports clubs established in 1987